The Rough Riders (1927) is a silent film directed by Victor Fleming, released by Paramount Pictures, and starring Noah Beery, Sr., Charles Farrell, George Bancroft, and Mary Astor. The picture is fictional account of Theodore Roosevelt's military unit in Cuba.  This film had an alternate release name: The Trumpet Call. The cinematography was by James Wong Howe and E. Burton Steene.

Incomplete or fragment prints of this movie are extant at the Museum of Modern Art and the Library of Congress.

Cast
Noah Beery as Hell's Bells
Charles Farrell as Stuart Van Brunt
George Bancroft as Happy Joe
Charles Emmett Mack as Bert Henley
Mary Astor as Dolly
Frank Hopper as Theodore Roosevelt (*some sources have him as Frank Hooper)
Fred Lindsay as Leonard Wood
Fred Kohler as Sgt. Stanton
Mark Hamilton as a soldier

References

External links

The Rough Riders at SilentEra
The Rough Riders at AllMovie
1927 New York Times review by Mourdant Hall

1927 films
American silent feature films
American black-and-white films
Films directed by Victor Fleming
Films shot in Texas
Spanish–American War films
Films set in Cuba
Cultural depictions of Theodore Roosevelt
1920s American films